Mafalda de Castilla (1191—1204) was an Infanta of Castile and daughter of Alfonso VIII of Castile and Eleanor of England and sister of Henry I of Castile and Berenguela of Castile.

She would have been married to Ferdinand of León, but she died in 1204 in Salamanca. She was buried at Abbey of Santa María la Real de Las Huelgas in Burgos. Her epitaph is "AQUÍ YACE DOÑA MAFALDA, HIJA DE ALFONSO VIII Y DE LA REINA DOÑA LEONOR Y HERMANA DE DOÑA BERENGUELA, QUE FINÓ EN SALAMANCA POR CASAR, EN 1204". The infante Pedro de Castilla y de Molina was buried in the same nave.

References

Bibliography
 
 

1191 births
1204 deaths
12th-century Spanish women
13th-century Spanish women
Castilian infantas
Daughters of kings